is a town located in Yamagata Prefecture, Japan. ,  the town had an estimated population of 23,367, in 7629 households, and a population density of 130 persons per km².

Geography
Takahata is located in mountainous southeastern Yamagata Prefecture. The Mogami River flows through the town.

Neighboring municipalities
Yamagata Prefecture
Yonezawa
Nan'yō
Kaminoyama
Kawanishi
Miyagi Prefecture
Shichikashuku
Fukushima Prefecture
Fukushima

Climate
Takahata has a Humid continental climate (Köppen climate classification Cfa/Dfa) with large seasonal temperature differences, with warm to hot (and often humid) summers and cold (sometimes severely cold) winters. Precipitation is significant throughout the year, but is heaviest from August to October.

Demographics
Per Japanese census data, the population of Takahata has declined slightly in recent decades.

History
The area of present-day Takahata was part of ancient Dewa Province. During the Edo period, it was a castle town ruled by a branch of the Oda clan until their transfer to Tendō Domain, and afterwards a portion was controlled by the Yonezawa Domain. After the start of the Meiji period, the area became part of Higashiokitama District, Yamagata Prefecture. The village of Takahata was established on April 1, 1889 with the creation of the modern municipalities system. It was elevated to town status on December 12, 1895, and the kanji used to write its name assumed its present form in January 1905.

Economy
The economy of Takahata is based on agriculture and forestry. The town is noted for its production Delaware grapes and for its wine.

Education
Takahata has six public elementary schools and four public middle schools operated by the town government,  and one public high school operated by the Yamagata Prefectural Board of Education. .

Transportation

Railway
 East Japan Railway Company -  Yamagata Shinkansen
 
 East Japan Railway Company -  Ōu Main Line

Highway
  – Nanyō-Takahata interchange

Sister city relations
 - Singleton, New South Wales, Australia

Local attractions
site of Takahata Castle
 Hinata Caves, National Historic Site
 Ōdachi Caves, National Historic Site 
 Hibakoiwa Caves, National Historic Site
 Ichinosawa Caves, National Historic Site

Notable people
Yuko Aoki, model
Shunsaku Kudō, Imperial Japanese Navy officer

References

External links
 
Official Website 

 
Towns in Yamagata Prefecture